"Sexy Dancer" was the follow-up single to Prince's self-titled second album in the UK. It was the first Prince single released outside the United States that was not released as a single stateside. The disco number has few lyrics but is not short on funk, using prominent bass guitar, grunts and screams to excite the listener. It also has elements of rock and rhythm & blues.

The 12" single was Prince's first non-album extended version to be released and because it was only ever released in the UK, a near mint 12" (UK Warner Brothers K 17590 T) copy can and has sold for over £100. It includes extended bass and guitar solos, as well as more repeats of the refrain. Listening to the extended version as compared to the album and Japanese 7" track, it appears likely they are in fact edited down. So perhaps it's more accurate to describe the 12" version as the "original", the LP and 7" being the shortened version. "Sexy Dancer" was a popular number performed live, often giving other band members the opportunity to perform instrumental solos.

The song has been modified over the years during live performances, often segueing into or out of other tracks, most recently during Prince's 2007 Earth Tour, where the music to the song is accompanied by completely different lyrics, including parts of the disco classic "Le Freak". The B-side of the track was the album track rocker, "Bambi" in the UK and "Why You Wanna Treat Me So Bad?" in Japan.

References

Prince (musician) songs
Songs written by Prince (musician)
1980 singles
Disco songs
Warner Records singles
Song recordings produced by Prince (musician)
Songs about dancing
1979 songs